Børge Petersen-Øverleir (born 3 February 1967 in Hemnesberget, Norway) is a Norwegian guitarist, raised in Bergen and Bodø, early active in heavy rock, autodidact in jazz centered around in Bodø.

Biography 
Petersen-Øverleir has collaborated on several recordings, including with Jan Gunnar Hoff, Henning Gravrok and Tore Johansen, as well as in trio with Tore Johansen and Arild Andersen.

Other cooperation has been on records and tours with Anita Skorgan, Kari Bremnes, Bjørn Eidsvåg, Halvdan Sivertsen, Søyr, Karoline Krüger, Ketil Bjørnstad, Kine Hellebust, Maria Solheim and Jørn Hoel, among others.

He has also been record producer for Eva Trones' releases of Terje Nilsens releases of children songs.

Discography

Solo album 
 2007: Songs From My Room (Songsfrommyroomrecords)

Collaborations 
 With 'Glass'
 1986: Eyes Will Talk (Hot Records)
 1994: Ædda Bædda (Majorstudio)

 With Halvdan Sivertsen
 1987: Ny Og Naken (Plateselskapet)
 1989: Førr Ei Dame (Plateselskapet)
 1991: Hilsen Halvdan (Plateselskapet)
 1994: Kjærlighetslandet
 1996: Helt Halvdan (Nordaførr)
 2001: Tvil, Håp Og Kjærlighet
 2003: Frelsesarmeens Juleplate

 With Terje Nilsen
 1987: Sørpolnissen ... Broren Til Julenissen (Grappa Music)
 1992: Kanskje (Darius)
 1996: Sånn (Nord-Norsk Plateselskap)
 2010: Møte, with Bodø Sinfonietta

 With Henning Gravrok
 1990: Minner Om I Morgen (Hot Club Records)
 1996: Hyss (Euridice)
 1998: Ord – Med Tekster Av Rolf Jacobsen (Tylden & Co)
 2006: Sense (Turn Left)
 2009: Q (Turn Left)

 With 'Lille Marius'
 1991: Bak Stengte Dører Single (Solution Records)
 1992: Bak Stengte Dører (Crema Records)

 With Bjørn Eidsvåg
 1993: Allemannsland (Norsk Plateproduksjon )
 1999: Tapt Uskyld (Metropol Music)
 2000: Hittil Og Littil (Petroleum Records)
 2001: A Poem For Peace
 2002: Tålt (Petroleum Records)
 2004: En Vakker Dag
 2006: Nåde
 2008: Pust
 2009: De Beste

 With Kari Bremnes
 1994: Gåte Ved Gåte (Kirkelig Kulturverksted)
 1997: Månestein (Kirkelig Kulturverksted)
 1998: Svarta Bjørn (Kirkelig Kulturverksted)
 2000: Norwegian Mood (Kirkelig Kulturverksted)
 2002: 11 Ubesvarte Anrop (Kirkelig Kulturverksted)
 2003: You'd Have To Be Here (Kirkelig Kulturverksted)
 2006: Over En By (Kirkelig Kulturverksted)

 With Oofotr
 1995: Oofotr (Norske Gram)

 With D'Sound
 1996: Spice Of Life (PolyGram, Urban)
 1998: Beauty Is a Blessing (PolyGram)
 2004: Smooth Escapes – The Very Best of D'Sound (Da Works)

 With Torbjørn Sunde
 1998: Meridians (ACT Music)

 With Jan Gunnar Hoff
 1998: Crosslands (Curling Legs)
 2003: In Town (Curling Legs)
 2007: Meditatus, with Bodø Domkor
 2012: Quiet Winter Night (2L), with Hoff Ensemble

 With Amy Studt
 2003: Under The Thumb (19 Recordings, Polydor)
 2003: False Smiles (19 Recordings, Polydor)
 2003: Misfit (Polydor)

 With 'Northern Arc'
 2012: Northern Arc (Curling Legs)

 With other projects
 1989: Tang Mellom Tærn, Himmel I Håret (Nordland Teater), with Nordland Teater
 1991: Op, Op I Skal Utsjunge, with Bodø Domkor conducted by Bjørn Andor Drage
 1992: Ta Meg Til Havet, with Hanne Krogh
 1992: Markedet, with Dag Kajander
 1993: Sol & regn (Plateselskapet Sol), with Arild Nyquist and Svein Olav Blindheim
 1994: Varm I Hodet (Kirkelig Kulturverksted), with Anders Wyller
 1994: Distant Shore (Origo Sound), with Sverre Knut Johansen
 1994: Get Up! (BMG Ariola), with Oslo Gospel Choir
 1994: Julenatt (WEA), with Anita Skorgan
 1995: Det syng, with Lynni Treekrem
 1995: Salmer, with Kristin Reitan
 1995: Tiden Kler Seg Naken (Kirkelig Kulturverksted), with 'Dronning Mauds Land'
 1995: The Best of Fra Lippo Lippi 85–95 (CNR Music), with Fra Lippo Lippi
 1995: Haugtussa (Kirkelig Kulturverksted), with Lynni Treekrem, music by Ketil Bjørnstad, lyrics by Arne Garborg
 1995: Stille Natt Hellige Natt (Master Music), with Cato Kristiansen
 1995: Vær Hilset! (Grappa Music), with Ola Bremnes and Bodø Domkor
 1996: Det Går Likar No (Norske Gram), with D.D.E.
 1996: Songs From The Pocket (Norsk Plateproduksjon), with Jørun Bøgeberg
 1996: Homeland (1996), with Line Thorstensen
 1996: Peak Man, with 'A Few Good Men'
 1996: Lys, with Jahn Teigen
 1997: Spindelsinn (Columbia), with Kari Rueslåtten
 1997: Smelter På Tungen (Norsk Plateproduksjon), with 'Dronning Mauds Land'
 1997: Så Skimrande Var Aldrig Havet (1997), with Elisabeth Andreassen
 1997: Tusen Små Rom (CNR Music), with Thore Pettersen
 1999: Arkana (Grappa Music), with Kjetil Saunes
 1999: Deilig (Grappa Music), with Jan Eggum
 1999: The Source Of Energy (Origo Sound), with Sverre Knut Johansen
 2000: 7 (Polydor), with S Club 7
 2000: Airborne (Columbia), with Torhild Sivertsen
 2000: Lucy Street, with Lucy Street
 2000: Kildespring : Nordnorske Folketoner, with Bodø Domkor
 2000: Julesalmer, with Kristin Reitan
 2001: Sunshine (Polydor), with S Club 7
 2001: After The Rain (Virgin), with Bellefire
 2001: Gull (2001), with Anita Skorgan
 2001: 2 Minutes Too Late, with Lucy Street
 2001: Lysbroen (White Mountain Records), with Torgils Gundersen
 2001: Barefoot (Kirkelig Kulturverksted), with Maria Solheim
 2001: 10 Sanger, with Lars Martin Myhre
 2002: Lovin' is Easy (Polydor), with Hear'Say
 2002: Another Phase (Columbia), with Maria Mena
 2002: Vanvittige Tider, with Blått og Rått
 2002: You Know Me, with Paris
 2002: Barcelona (Bonnier Amigo Music Norway), with Paperboys & Madcon
 2002: Border Girl (Universal Records), with Paulina Rubio
 2003: Sweet Dreams My L.A. Ex (Polydor), with Rachel Stevens
 2003: Maria Arredondo (Universal), with Maria Arredondo
 2003: Say It Isn't So, with Gareth Gates
 2003: Give Me A Reason (Polydor), with Triple Eight
 2003: Mysteriet (Mysterri) Single (Epic), with Aki Sirkesalo & Lisa Nilsson
 2003: Funky Dory (Polydor), with Rachel Stevens
 2003: Brim Og Båra – Bodø Domkor Syng Blix, with Bodø Domkor
 2003: SoulO (Universal Records), with Nick Lachey
 2003: Measure Of A Man (RCA), with Clay Aiken
 2003: Go Your Own Way (BMG UK & Ireland), with Gareth Gates
 2003: Samlade Sånger 1992–2003 (Diesel Music, Sony Music), with Lisa Nilsson
 2003: Lille Bille – Eva Trones Synger Barnesanger Av Terje Nilsen (Euridice), with Eva Trones
 2004: Wiggle It (	Bonnier Amigo Music Norway ), with Paperboys
 2004: Lånte Fjær (White Mountain Records), with Torgils Gundersen
 2004: Killing Floor, with Wiggo Johnsen
 2004: Felino, with Electrocutango
 2004: Need To Know, with Anne Hvidsten
 2004: The Meaning Of Love, with Michelle McManus
 2004: Not Going Under (Universal), with Maria Arredondo
 2004: White Turns Blue (Columbia), with Maria Mena
 2004: Neste Sommer (Bonnier Amigo Music Group), with Pita featuring Mary L
 2004: The Sun Has Come Your Way, with Sam & Mark
 2004: Over (Casablanca), with Lindsay Lohan
 2004: Songs From A Gameboy – Generation Toughguy, with Wiggo Johnsen
 2004: Speak (Casablanca), with Lindsay Lohan
 2004: A Part of Me, with Kurt Nilsen
 2005: Last Minute, with Kristin Frogner
 2005: Apparently Unaffected, with Maria Mena
 2005: When Worlds Collide, with Paperboys
 2006: Sånn Bærre E Det, with Raymond Hansen
 2006: Til Meg, with Unni Wilhelmsen
 2006: Receita Para A Vida, with Claudio Latini
 2007: Tomorrow Only Knows, with Alejandro Fuentes
 2007: For a Moment, with Maria Arredondo
 2008: Stayer (Kirkelig Kulturverksted), with Lars Bremnes
 2008: Høyoktan, with 'Blått og Rått'
 2008: Cause and Effect, with Maria Mena
 2008: Hold On Be Strong, with Maria Haukaas Storeng
 2008: Sichelle, with Sichelle
 2008: Paradiso, with Moment
 2008: En Kærlighedsaffære, with Karen Busck
 2008: Chasing Lights, with The Saturdays
 2008: Episoder, with Kaia Huuse
 2008: Tiden Går Altfor Fort, with Kjell Widlund
 2008: Sammen Er Vi Blå, with Sarpsborg Sparta Fotballklubb
 2008: Måne Blek, with Kjetil Saunes
 2009: Våge, with Per Øystein Sørensen
 2009: U And I, Ted, with 'U And I, Ted'
 2009: Æ Ror Aleina, with Tonje Unstad
 2009: This Gig Almost Got Me Killed, with Ovi
 2009: Christmas in Bethlehem, with Carola
 2010: Trond Trudvang, with Trond Trudvang
 2010: Søt musikk (2010), with Inge Ulrik Gundersen
 2010: A Thousand Different Ways/Measure Of A Man, with Clay Aiken
 2010: Cocool, with Tone Damli
 2010: A Million Miles Away (album)|A Million Miles Away, with Marian Aas Hansen
 2010: Waiting for Daylight, with a1
 2010: 20 – En Jubileumssamling (Sony Music), with Lisa Nilsson
 2010: Have Yourself A Merry Little Christmas, with Kurt Nilsen
 2011: Alvedans, with Magnar Birkeland
 2011: Smooth Jazz Cafe 11, with Marek Niedźwiecki
 2011: What Are Words, with Chris Medina
 2012: Master Of Imperfection, with Per Øystein Sørensen
 2012: Looking Back, with Tone Damli
 2012: Real Life Love, with Chesney Hawkes
 2012: Rolig EP, with Jakob Jordal
 2012: 1949 EP(), with Sveinar Heskestad
 2013: Alvin Pang, with Ketil Høegh, Endre Lund Eriksen and Tore Johansen
 2014: Hus Ved Havet, with Trond Nilsen
 2014: Gata Der Jeg Bor, with Roar Antonsen
 2014: Hus Ved Havet, with Trond Nilsen
 2015: Ingen Gör Det Bättre (Diesel Music), with Lisa Nilsson
 2015: Samle På Gode Minna, with Per-Kai Prytz
 2015: Livet Blir Sjelden Slik Man Har Tenkt Seg, with Roar Antonsen

 With various artists
 1982: Marathon Rock-82 (Igloo Records), with 'Darria'
 1988: Vi Synger Julen Inn Med Korene I Bodø Domkirke (Bodø Domkirke)
 1993: Bodø/Glimt Førr Evig Single (Bodø/Glimt)
 1993: Det Finns Ikke Maken Single (Bodø/Glimt)
 1994: Tiddelibom – Bodø Rockeklubb 1979–1994 (Bodø Rockeklubb)
 2000: Glimt I Øyet (Bodø/Glimt)
 2001: Distant Reports – Jazz From North Norway (Gemini Records)
 2005: Venn
 2008: Shockadelica – 50th Anniversary Tribute To The Artist Known As Prince
 2012: Stille, Stille Vinternatt – Musikk Fra Blåfjell

References 

Living people
1967 births
20th-century Norwegian guitarists
21st-century Norwegian guitarists
Norwegian jazz guitarists
Norwegian jazz composers
Musicians from Bodø
Musicians from Nordland
People from Hemnes
Søyr members